Tudor House may refer to:

United Kingdom
Southampton Tudor House and Garden, Southampton, England
Tudor House, Chester, Cheshire, England
Tudor House, Langport, Somerset, England
Tudor House Museum, Weymouth, England
Tudor House, Stevenage, England
Tudor Merchant's House, Tenby, Wales

Elsewhere
Tudor House School, Moss Vale, New South Wales, Australia
Owen Tudor Hedges House, Hedgesville, West Virginia, United States
Tudor Fieldhouse, Houston, Texas, United States